American Gothic is a 1988 slasher film directed by John Hough and starring Rod Steiger, Yvonne De Carlo, Janet Wright and Michael J. Pollard. The film poster is a take-off on the Grant Wood painting of the same name: American Gothic.

Plot 

Cynthia is traumatized by the death of her baby after leaving him in a bathtub, where he accidentally drowned. She and five of her friends, Jeff, Rob, Lynn, Paul and Terri decide to go on a vacation. They take a plane somewhere but are plagued by engine troubles and are forced to land the plane on a lonely deserted island. The six set camp, and the next morning, Paul stays at the camp while the others set off to find help. They come upon a large cottage nestled in the woods.

After entering the cottage and fooling around a bit, they meet the owners, an elderly married couple going by the simple names of Ma and Pa. The group of friends is welcomed to spend the night. At dinner, Lynn starts smoking and Pa scolds her and demands that she smoke outside. Later, Lynn and Cynthia discover Ma and Pa have a child, Fanny, who looks more like a middle-aged woman but claims she is 12. That night, Ma and Pa throw more strict rules in, such as no cussing and forcing the girls and boys apart to prevent premarital sex.

The night passes by, and the next morning, Rob goes for a walk and finds Fanny pushing her brother, Woody, on a crudely crafted swing. Rob is invited to swing and agrees, only for Woody to climb to the top and chop the rope, sending Rob down the rocky cliff below to his death. The group finds out about Rob's death and mourn his loss. Later, Lynn and Cynthia are outside, and Lynn talks about how this family is a bunch of freaks and Fanny overhears. Cynthia sees this after Lynn leaves and consoles Fanny and reluctantly agrees to play games with Fanny. Fanny shows Cynthia her baby, thought to be just a doll, but it turns out to be the remains of an infant. Cynthia meets another brother, Teddy, and Fanny explains to him that Cynthia is her friend. Meanwhile, Lynn stumbles upon Woody, Teddy, and Fanny playing jump rope in the woods. After Lynn insults them, she is attacked and presumably killed by the three.

Cynthia tells Jeff about the mummified infant. Jeff tries to console Cynthia and they kiss. Fanny, who wants Jeff to herself, sees and becomes jealous. She confronts the two and kills Jeff by stabbing him in the eye with a sword on a knight statue. Cynthia explains her fear to Ma, but Ma attacks her, saying they are all wicked people. Cynthia flees, and Ma finishes Jeff off with her sewing needles. Cynthia runs into the woods, finding Lynn's corpse hanging from a tree and a frightened Terri. Cynthia explains everything to Terri and learns that Paul and the plane are missing. Woody and Teddy find the girls and chase them into the woods. Terri and Cynthia find Fanny, and Terri reveals a gun and holds Fanny at gunpoint, forcing her to help them get off the island. They show Fanny to Ma and Pa and demand their help to get off the island. To save his daughter, Pa tells the girls where a boat is. He leads them to a dinky fisherman's boat, where Paul's corpse is lying, an ax buried in his skull. Cynthia and Terri flee, and Teddy and Woody light Paul's body on fire.

Night comes, and Terri and Cynthia spend the night in a hollow tree. Terri and Cynthia run back to the cottage to find a radio but are attacked by Woody and Teddy. Teddy pursues Terri into the woods, and Fanny toys with Cynthia. Terri is caught by Teddy and has her neck snapped. Teddy rapes Terri's corpse, Woody tattletales, and Teddy gets a beating as Cynthia watches in horror. Cynthia eventually breaks down and becomes one of the family, celebrating Fanny's birthday and dressing in a pink gown to match Fanny. However, the flashbacks of her baby drowning get to her; she goes mad, bludgeoning Fanny to death with a metal washtub. She then murders Woody with the sword. She then confronts Ma and stabs her to death with her sewing needles. She finds Teddy and stabs him with a sickle. Pa discovers his family dead and goes outside only to be shot by his own shotgun by Cynthia, who has taken revenge and killed the demented family. The film ends as Cynthia goes upstairs, sits in Fanny's room, and slowly begins rocking the cradle, singing a soft lullaby.

Cast

Production 

The film was shot in the winter of 1986–1987 on Bowen Island near Vancouver, British Columbia, Canada.

Release 

American Gothic was released in Chicago on 20 May 1988.

Home media 

Fangoria stated the film was being prepared for a July or August released on home video by Vidmark Entertainment. American Gothic was released on VHS and Betamax by Vidmark Entertainment on 7 September 1988. The film was also released on VHS by Virgin as Hide and Shriek.

It was released for the first time on DVD by Trinity Home Entertainment on 28 September 2004. It was re-released by Stax Entertainment in the United Kingdom on 27 March 2006, in a truncated cut, running 85 minutes. E1 Entertainment the film on DVD in Canada on 14 October 2008. Shout! Factory released the film for the first time on Blu-ray on 19 December 2017.

Reception 

Caryn James from The New York Times gave the film a negative review, stating that the film "offers just a few meager possibilities for unintentional campy comedy". Author and film critic Leonard Maltin awarded the film a BOMB, his lowest rating, writing, "Populated exclusively by obnoxious characters; even Steiger can't help this one."
VideoHound's Golden Movie Retriever, awarded the film their lowest rating, calling it "A stultifying career low for all involved."

A critic for the New York Daily News noted that while the plot is "pedestrian," the film "comes through with an impressive array of truly sicko surprises...  Rod Steiger and Yvonne DeCarlo are consistently entertaining in what may be the most humiliating roles of their already checkered careers." TV Guide awarded the film two out of five stars, writing: "Despite the rather obvious plotting, derivative of everything from Psycho and more recent Spam-in-a-cabin epics to The Most Dangerous Game, this Canadian effort is mildly interesting. Without a doubt, however, the performances of Steiger and Torgov are the most noteworthy aspects of the film. Steiger's Bible-spouting, moralizing patriarch is superb, given the weakness of the material in general. Torgov's part is better written, and she makes the most of it, letting us see madness in her eyes better than anyone since Barbara Steele."

References

External links
 
 
 

1988 films
1980s English-language films
1988 horror films
1980s slasher films
Canadian independent films
English-language Canadian films
Films directed by John Hough
British independent films
Canadian slasher films
British slasher films
Necrophilia in film
Films set in Washington (state)
1980s Canadian films
1980s British films